William "Bill" Solon Dellinger (born March 23, 1934) is a retired American middle-distance runner. He competed in the 5,000 m at the 1956, 1960 and 1964 Olympics and won a bronze medal in 1964, setting his personal record. He lettered in track at the University of Oregon in 1954, 1955, and 1956.

Coaching career

Upon retirement from competition, Dellinger took a position as the assistant coach to Bill Bowerman for the Oregon Ducks track and field team. After Bowerman's retirement in 1972, Dellinger succeeded him as head coach. In his 25 years of coaching, Dellinger's men won five NCAA titles, achieved 108 All American honors, and had a 134-29 meet record.

He was instrumental in the development and coaching of Oregon and American great distance star Steve Prefontaine in conjunction with Bowerman, and their experience was made into a 1997 film Prefontaine, in which Bill Dellinger was played by Ed O'Neill.

In Co-Operation with Adidas, Dellinger developed the so called "Dellinger Web", a Cushioning Technology used on various Shoes throughout the 80s and early 90s.

Dellinger also coached many post-collegians including Olympians Mary Decker, Bill McChesney (athlete), Alberto Salazar, Matt Centrowitz, Don Clary, and many others.

After retiring from coaching

Dellinger retired from the University of Oregon in 1998  and would later join his mentor, Bill Bowerman, as an inductee in the National Track and Field Hall of Fame in 2001. Also after he retierd he had a stroke.

Since retirement, he has stayed out of the Track and Field world, except for a few appearances at meets named in his honor.

In 2021 USA Track and Field awarded Dellinger their Legend Coach Award.

Records 

Records set by Dellinger:

1956 American Record holder: 5000 meters 14:16.2
1958 American Record holder: 1500 meters 3:41.5
1959 World Record holder (indoors): 2 miles 8:49.9
1959 World Record holder (indoors): 3 miles 13:37.0
1960 American record holder: 2 miles 8:43.8

See also
Prefontaine
Inspirational/motivational instructors/mentors portrayed in films

References

External links 

 

1934 births
Living people
American male middle-distance runners
Olympic bronze medalists for the United States in track and field
Athletes (track and field) at the 1956 Summer Olympics
Athletes (track and field) at the 1959 Pan American Games
Athletes (track and field) at the 1960 Summer Olympics
Athletes (track and field) at the 1964 Summer Olympics
Oregon Ducks men's track and field athletes
Oregon Ducks track and field coaches
American track and field coaches
Sportspeople from Grants Pass, Oregon
Medalists at the 1964 Summer Olympics
Pan American Games gold medalists for the United States
Track and field athletes from Oregon
Pan American Games medalists in athletics (track and field)
Medalists at the 1959 Pan American Games